Francis George House (22 February 1884 – 23 February 1963) was an Australian rules footballer who played with St Kilda in the Victorian Football League (VFL).

Notes

External links 

1884 births
1963 deaths
Australian rules footballers from Melbourne
St Kilda Football Club players
People from St Kilda, Victoria